Phtheochroides clandestina is a species of moth of the family Tortricidae. It is found in the Pamir Mountains of Central Asia, in Japan and the Kuril Islands.

References

Moths described in 1968
Cochylini